Murrain  (also known as distemper) is an antiquated term for various infectious diseases affecting cattle and sheep. The word originates from Middle English moreine or moryne, as a derivative of Latin mori "to die". 

The word murrain, much like the word pestilence, did not refer to a specific disease but rather was an umbrella term for what are now recognized as a number of different diseases with high morbidity and mortality, such as rinderpest, erysipelas, foot-and-mouth disease, anthrax, and streptococcus infections. Some of these livestock diseases could also affect humans. The term murrain also referred to an epidemic of such a disease. There were major sheep and cattle murrains in Europe during the 14th century, which, combined with the Little Ice Age, resulted in the Great Famine of 1315–1317, weakening the population of Europe before the onset of the Black Death in 1348.

Biblical references
The term murrain is also used in some Bible translations relating to the fifth plague brought upon Egypt.

Exodus 9:3: "Behold, the hand of the LORD is upon thy cattle which is in the field, upon the horses, upon the asses, upon the camels, upon the oxen, and upon the sheep: there shall be a very grievous murrain."

"Pestilence", which is mentioned 47 times in 46 verses of the Bible, can be translated "murrain" by Christian apologists.
[Enhanced Strong's Lexicon].
see Psalms 91:3 KJV

The word in Hebrew is דֶּבֶר "dever" (Strong's # 01698), derived from the primitive root "dabar" in the sense of "to destroy."

Superstitions 
In some parts of Scotland, force-fire was believed to cure it. In some remote regions of Cumbria, England, and the Isle of Man, murrain is still used as a term for a curse, specifically a curse placed upon land or livestock. It is believed that the medieval term has, by a process of syncreticism become synonymous with witchcraft. This usage inspired the ATV television play, Murrain, written by Manxman Nigel Kneale, which was broadcast on 27 July 1975 as part of the channel's  Against the Crowd drama strand.

Distemper among cattle in England, 1745–1757
In those years, acts of the Parliament of Great Britain were passed to "more effectually to prevent the spreading of distemper which now rages amongst the horned cattle in this kingdom".

References

Curses
Ruminant diseases
Livestock